The 1922 Currie Cup was the 13th edition of the Currie Cup, the premier domestic rugby union competition in South Africa.

See also

 Currie Cup

References

1922
1922 in South African rugby union
Currie